Mortal Coils is a collection of five short fictional pieces written by Aldous Huxley in 1921.

The title uses a phrase from Hamlet, Act 3, Scene 1:
 ... To die, to sleep,
To sleep, perchance to dream; aye, there's the rub,
For in that sleep of death, what dreams may come,
When we have shuffled off this mortal coil,
Must give us pause ...

The stories all concern themselves with some sort of trouble, normally of an amorous nature, and often ending with disappointment.

The stories
"The Gioconda Smile" is a mixture of social satire and murder story, which Huxley later adapted into a film called A Woman's Vengeance (1948).
"Permutations Among the Nightingales" is a play concerning the amorous problems encountered by various patrons of a hotel.
"The Tillotson Banquet" tells of an old artist who was thought to be dead, and is "rediscovered"; a not entirely successful honorary dinner is organised for him.
"Green Tunnels" is about the boredom of a young girl on holiday with her family. She develops a romantic fantasy, and is ultimately disillusioned.
"Nuns at Luncheon" is a second-hand story told of a nun falling in love. The story mocks the writer's process, a concept Huxley used in his novel Crome Yellow.

References

External links

1922 short story collections
Short story collections by Aldous Huxley
Chatto & Windus books